John Varah Long (28 September 1826, in Wickersley, England – 14 April 1869) was a clerk for Brigham Young, the first governor of Utah Territory and the second president of the Church of Jesus Christ of Latter-day Saints (also known as LDS Church). 

On November 1, 2007, KTVX, a Salt Lake City television station, announced that a number of his diaries and letters related to his position had surfaced. These records appear likely to reveal a great amount of additional historical perspective and detail with regard to both the views and doings of Young, as well as added insight into the early operations of various aspects of the LDS Church.

References

"ABC 4 Investigation: Decoding Brigham Young's pioneer past", ABC-4, Utah4.com, November 1, 2007
John Varah Long at RootsWeb
Hance, Irma Watson. "A Biographical Sketch of John Varah Long: His Diaries, Writings, Lectures and Notes." ACCN 278, Special Collections, Marriott Library.	
Sanders, Ken and Bagley, Will. John Varah Long: Forgotten Utah Writer and Pioneer, Ken Sanders Rare Books (accessed 19 January 2017)

English Latter Day Saints
Secretaries
People from the Metropolitan Borough of Rotherham
English emigrants to the United States
1826 births
1869 deaths